Falcuna dorotheae is a butterfly in the family Lycaenidae. It is found in Cameroon and North Kivu in the Democratic Republic of the Congo. The habitat consists of primary forests.

References

Butterflies described in 1963
Poritiinae